Air Chief Marshal Farooq Feroze Khan  (born: 17 August 1939 – 9 October 2021), best known as Feroze Khan, was a Pakistani military officer who served as the 6th four-star air officer in the Pakistan Air Force and also served as the 8th Chairman Joint Chiefs of Staff Committee, appointed in 1994 and retiring in 1997.

His career in the Air Force is subjected to distinction as he was the only air force officer whose career spanned more than 40 years of military service. He is also the only Air Force general to be appointed a Chairman joint chiefs to date.

Biography

Early life and career in the military

Farooq Feroze Khan was born in Bombay, Bombay Province in British India Empire on 17 August 1939. His family belonged to a Burki tribe of Pashtun ethnicity, hailing from Jalandhar. His father, Feroze Khan, Sr., was a professional Field hockey player who won the Olympic gold medal for India, but later migrated and played for the Pakistan National Hockey Team for the remainder of his life.

Feroze was educated at the PAF Public School in Sargodha where he completed his Senior Cambridge, and joined the Pakistan Air Force in 1956. He was sent to attend the Pakistan Air Force Academy in Risalpur, but later selected as one of few cadets to attend the U.S. Air Force Academy in Colorado, United States. Upon completing the pilot training program from the USAF Academy, Feroze gained commission as a P/Off. in the No. 9 Squadron Griffins of the Air Force in January 1959.

In the United States, he was trained as a fighter pilot to fly the F-104 Starfighter on several aerial combat missions. He was known for his skills while maneuvering the aircraft in a combat mode from a subsonic to supersonic speed. While living in the United States, Flt-Lt. Feroze Khan served as an exchange officer with the United States Air Force, completing several years of aerial combat training with the American pilots. Upon returning in the 1960s, he was attached to the Royal Air Force as a military liaison officer, and flew British aircraft in their inventory.

In 1965, Squadron-Leader Feroze flew on his F-104 Starfighter on various combat missions against the Indian Air Force during the various combat missions during the second war with India. After the war, Sq-Ldr. Feroze was sent to join the No. 5 Squadron Falcons, which later formed the PAF's aerobatics team, Sherdils, where he displayed his skills while flying the F-104, alongside the F-86 Sabre flown by Flight lieutenant Cecil.

In 1966–67, Sq-Ldr. Feroze was among the first group of fighter pilots who were sent to France for their conversion from American F-104 to French Mirage-III. After his conversion, Sqn. Ldr. Feroze was posted as an air adviser to the Eastern Air Command in East-Pakistan, providing mission support to conduct combat air patrol near the Kalaikunda Air Force Station near the Eastern front of India.

In 1971, Sqn. Ldr. Feroze, now flying the Mirage-III, participated in preemptive airstrikes in India, which eventually led to the third war with India.

Death
Farooq Feroze died due to cardiac arrest in Islamabad on 9 October 2021 at the age of 82.

War and command appointments
After the third war with India in 1971, Wing-Commander Feroze joined the faculty of the Combat Commander's School in Sargodha Air Force Base, instructing on the methods of combat flights. During this time, Wg-Cdr. Feroze was posted in the Pakistan Armed Forces–Middle East Command, briefly commanding a fighter wing in the United Arab Emirates Air Force for nearly three years.

In 1982–83, Air-Commodore Feroze was elevated as the base commander of the Sargodha AFB, witnessing the introduction of American-built F-16s. In 1984–85, Air-Cdre. Feroze was promoted to the two-star promotion when Air Vice-Marshal Feroze was appointed AOC of the Southern Air Command based in Karachi, and later as the Central Air Command based in Sargodha. In 1988, Air Vice Marshal Feroze, serving as the Deputy Chief of the Air Staff (Operations) was elevated to the three-star promotion when he was appointed the Vice Chief of the Air Staff (VCAS) under ACM Hakeemullah Durrani. During this time, Air-Marshal Feroze took an interest and participated in board of inquiry that investigated the mysterious circumstances involved in the death of President Zia-ul-Haq.

In 1990, Air-Mshl. Feroze was taken on secondment by Prime Minister Benazir Bhutto as the Managing-Director of the Pakistan International Airlines, which he managed until 1991.

Chief of Air staff

On 9 March 1991, Prime Minister Nawaz Sharif promoted Air-Mshl. Feroze to the four-star air officer in the Pakistan Air Force, subsequently appointing the Air Chief Marshal as the new Chief of Air Staff (CAS). ACM Feroze assumed the command of the Air Force at a difficult time, when the military embargo by the United States on a suspicion of a covert nuclear weapons program was enforced. During this time, he launched the program to acquire the license to reproduce the Australian Mirage-III and induction of F-7P from China at the Pakistan Aeronautical Complex (PAC).

In 1994, ACM Feroze was given a one-year extension to continue serving as an air chief.

Chairman joint chiefs
In 1994, the extension made him the most senior military officer in the Pakistani military but this became a subject of controversy in the Air Force, when many senior air officers showed resentment towards this decision taken by the civil government at that time. Upon the retirement of Gen. Shamim Alam on 8 November 1994, Prime Minister Benazir Bhutto approved ACM Feroze to be elevated as the Chairman Joint Chiefs of Staff Committee—this was the first time the chairmanship was rotated to the Air Force since its inception in 1976.

As Chairman joint chiefs, ACM Feroze attempted to procure the MiG-29F and the Su-27 aircraft from the Eastern Europe as well as Mirage 2000 from Qatar, with a view to replacing the F-16s but this was met with strong opposition from ACM Khattak, the air chief, who was unimpressed with the war performances of Russian fighter jets. In 1995, Gen. Feroze Khan also provided his crucial military support and political advocacy for the development of the Shaheen program with a view to keeping the second-strike capability.

His tenure as Chairman joint chiefs is criticized by the defense observer in the country for not being able to take steps in strengthening the role of Joint Chiefs of Staff Committee, and was largely seen as ineffective and unable to provide any military or political advice to Prime Minister Benazir Bhutto and her administration on a longer extension— the void was filled by then-army chief, Gen. Jehangir Karamat.

Critics observed that ACM Feroze's preference of "flying solo" and his nature of working alone further complicated the matters in the military that required the comprehensive collaboration and teamwork in national security issues. According to the critical paper penned by defense analyst, Ikram Sehgal, "ACM Feroze marked ineffectiveness in the post of Chairman and its institution."

Upon retiring on 9 November 1997, Gen. Jehangir Karamat was eventually appointed to replace him and who took the role of the Joint Chiefs of Staff Committee to new heights and took the four-tiered military into a responsive and efficient fighting machine in the 21st century. His uniform was placed in the PAF Museum in Karachi, where he was retired in his estate.

Awards and decorations

Foreign Decorations

See also 
Pakistan-United States military relations

References

External links
PAF Chiefs of Air Staff

|-

|-

1939 births
2021 deaths
Pashtun people
Military personnel from Mumbai
PAF College Sargodha alumni
Pakistan Air Force Academy alumni
United States Air Force Academy alumni
United States Air Force officers
Pakistani expatriates in the United States
Pakistan Air Force officers
Pakistani test pilots
Pilots of the Indo-Pakistani War of 1965
Pakistani flying aces
Pakistani military personnel of the Indo-Pakistani War of 1971
Pilots of the Indo-Pakistani War of 1971
Pakistani expatriates in the United Arab Emirates
Pakistan Air Force air marshals
Pakistan International Airlines people
Chiefs of Air Staff, Pakistan
Chairmen Joint Chiefs of Staff Committee
Pakistan Hockey Federation presidents
People from Mumbai
Muhajir people
St. Patrick's High School, Karachi alumni
Indian emigrants to Pakistan